162 Laurentia is a large and dark main-belt asteroid that was discovered by the French brothers Paul Henry and Prosper Henry on 21 April 1876, and named after Joseph Jean Pierre Laurent, an amateur astronomer who discovered asteroid 51 Nemausa.

An occultation by Laurentia was observed from Clive, Alberta on 21 November 1999.

Photometric observations of this asteroid from multiple observatories during 2007 gave a light curve with a period of 11.8686 ± 0.0004 hours and a brightness variation of 0.40 ± 0.05 in magnitude. This is in agreement with previous studies in 1994 and 2007.

References

External links 
 
 

000162
Discoveries by Paul Henry and Prosper Henry
Named minor planets
000162
000162
000162
18760421